1859 Kovalevskaya, provisional designation , is a carbonaceous asteroid from the outer regions of the asteroid belt, approximately 40 kilometers in diameter.

It was discovered on 4 September 1972, by Russian–Ukrainian astronomer Lyudmila Zhuravleva at the Crimean Astrophysical Observatory in Nauchnyj, on the Crimean peninsula. The asteroid was named after Russian mathematician Sofia Kovalevskaya.

Orbit and classification 

Kovalevskaya orbits the Sun in the outer main-belt at a distance of 2.9–3.5 AU once every 5 years and 9 months (2,100 days). Its orbit has an eccentricity of 0.10 and an inclination of 8° with respect to the ecliptic.

Physical characteristics 

Kovalevskaya has been characterized as a dark C-type asteroid.

Lightcurves 

In September 2013, photometric observations at the Palomar Transient Factory, California, gave a rotational lightcurve with a period of  hours and a brightness variation of 0.13 in magnitude.

Diameter and albedo 

According to the surveys carried out by the Infrared Astronomical Satellite (IRAS) and the NEOWISE mission of NASA's Wide-field Infrared Survey Explorer, Kovalevskaya measures between 44.6 and 48.8 kilometers in diameter, and its surface has a low albedo between 0.043 and 0.069.

The Collaborative Asteroid Lightcurve Link assumes a standard albedo for carbonaceous asteroids of 0.057 and calculates a smaller diameter of 34.4 kilometers with an absolute magnitude of 11.05.

Naming 

This minor planet was named after the first major Russian mathematician, Sofia Kovalevskaya (1850–1891), who has made important contributions to partial differential equations and rigid body motion (also see Kovalevskaya top). The lunar crater Kovalevskaya is also named after her. The official  was published by the Minor Planet Center on 1 June 1975.

From 1972 to 1992, the discoverer of this asteroid, Lyudmila Zhuravleva, has made more than 200 minor planets discoveries, and ranks 61st on the Minor Planet Center discoverer chart.

References

External links 
 Asteroid Lightcurve Database (LCDB), query form (info )
 Dictionary of Minor Planet Names, Google books
 Asteroids and comets rotation curves, CdR – Observatoire de Genève, Raoul Behrend
 Discovery Circumstances: Numbered Minor Planets (1)-(5000) – Minor Planet Center
 
 

001859
Discoveries by Lyudmila Zhuravleva
Named minor planets
19720904